Arjuna Harjai is an Indian composer, singer and musician working in Bollywood who is also known for composing advertising music.

His association with director Nikkhil Advani, composing music and songs for film Guddu Engineer and television series P.O.W. - Bandi Yuddh Ke received praise from critics. For P.O.W. - Bandi Yuddh Ke, Harjai composed the original score for 107 episodes and composed six songs, he also lent his voice for all the songs along with co singers Nandini Srikar, Shashaa Tirupati, Jonita Gandhi and Surabhi Dashputra.

His work is noted for Nikkhil Advani's Lucknow Central film starring Farhan Akhtar directed by Ranjit Tiwari for which Arjuna Harjai composed three songs, background score and the soundtracks for trailers and commercials.

Early life and education 

Harjai started learning Hindustani classical music from his parents at a very young age and was exposed to various music styles. He moved to Mumbai in 2006 to further study under playback singer Suresh Wadkar. He also studied piano as his main instrument since a very young age and went on to study until Grade 8 of western classical and jazz piano from Delhi school of music and in 2008 he passed out from SAE Institute, Mumbai as the highest scorer in Audio Engineering. In 2009 he studied jazz and counterpoint composition under various music exchange programs in Delhi and Mumbai.

Career 
While composing advertising jingles for major brands, Harjai continued assisting music composer Lalit Pandit for projects such as  Besharam and Dabangg.

Harjai began composing for cinema when Punjabi producer Rajan batra was looking for a new composer with a distinct vision for his feature film Titoo MBA. Harjai went on to compose the entire soundtrack for the film. and has continued with a number of other film soundtracks and songs. By 2022 Harjai has a portfolio of composing over 500 advertising jingles and a dozen feature films. Since 2021 Harjai has been working remotely after he relocated temporarily to United Kingdom on a dependent visa as his wife is pursuing a postgraduate degree.  Arjuna Harjai has two YouTube channels, one named 'Arjuna Harjai' that features vlogs (1.2 Mn subscribers), another one called 'Arjuna Harjai 2.0' featuring podcasts with interesting guests which he manages alongside his career as a music composer.

In 2023 he collaborated with Sounds of Isha and various International artists like  Machel Montano Marge Blackman and Sandeep Narayan to create the Save Soil and Come Awake anthems for supporting the Save Soil movement by Sadhguru

International

Singles

Filmography

Awards and critical reception

Songs

References

External links 
 
 

Year of birth missing (living people)
Living people
Bollywood playback singers
Hindi film score composers
Indian lyricists
Indian pop composers
Jingle composers
Musicians from Delhi